Massimo Di Cataldo (born 25 April 1968) is an Italian singer-songwriter and actor.

Life and career 
Born in Rome, after the high school Di Cataldo made several experiences poised between singing and acting, including a 1993 appearance in the Rai 2 TV-series I ragazzi del muretto in which he played a singer. The same year he was a finalist in the Castrocaro Music Festival. 

In 1995 Di Cataldo entered the competition at the Sanremo Music Festival with the song "Che sarà di me", ranking second in the newcomers section. The same year he released his debut album, Siamo nati liberi, which was a commercial success replicated a year later by the album Anime (whose lead single, "Se adesso te ne vai", ranked fourth at the Big Artists competition of the Sanremo Music Festival) and in 1997 by the album Crescendo. 

In 1999 Di Cataldo participated for the third and last time at the Sanremo Festival with the song "Come sei bella", which was followed by the album Dieci. In the following years he mainly focused on live performances and concerts.

Discography

Studio albums 
 1995 - Siamo nati liberi
 1996 - Libres como el viento
 1996 - Anime
 1997 - Con el alma
 1997 - Crescendo
 1999 - Dieci
 2002 - Veramente
 2005 - Sulla mia strada
 2009 – Macchissenefrega
 2010 – Universo
 2019 – Dal profondo

Compilation albums 
 1997 – Best of Massimo Di Cataldo
 2001 – Il mio tempo
 2006 – I consigli del cuore
 2015 – Addendum

References

External links
  
  

1968 births
Italian male singers
Italian pop singers 
Living people
Singers from Rome
Spanish-language singers of Italy